Tring  is a market town and civil parish in the Borough of Dacorum, Hertfordshire, England. It is situated in a gap passing through the Chiltern Hills, classed as an Area of Outstanding Natural Beauty,  from Central London. Tring is linked to London by the Roman road of Akeman Street, by the modern A41 road, by the Grand Union Canal and by the West Coast Main Line to London Euston. Settlements in Tring date back to prehistoric times and it was mentioned in the Domesday Book; the town received its market charter in 1315. Tring is now largely a commuter town within the London commuter belt.
As of 2013, Tring had a population of 11,731.

Toponymy
The name Tring is believed to derive from the Old English Tredunga or Trehangr, 'Tre' meaning 'tree' and  the suffix 'ing' implying 'a slope where trees grow'.

History

There is evidence of prehistoric settlement with Iron Age barrows and defensive embankments adjacent to The Ridgeway, and also later Saxon burials. The town straddles the Roman road called Akeman Street, running through as the High Street.
Tring was the dominant settlement in the area, being the primary settlement in the Hundred of Tring at the time of the Domesday Book (1086). Tring had a large population and paid a large amount of tax relative to most settlements listed in that survey. Landholdings included the manor of Treunga, assigned to Count Eustace II of Boulogne by William the Conqueror.

In 1315 the town was granted a market charter by Edward II. This charter gave Faversham Abbey the right to hold weekly markets on Tuesdays, and a ten-day fair starting on 29 June, the Feast of Saints Peter and Paul. It also prevented the creation of any rival markets within a day's travel of the town. The tower of the Church of St Peter and St Paul was built between 1360 and 1400.

Until 1440, there was a small village east of Tring called Pendley (or Penley, Pendele, or Pentlai). The landowner Sir Robert Whittingham received a grant of free warren from King Henry VI. He enclosed 200 acres (about 80 hectares) and tore down the buildings on the land, returning the estate to pasture, and built a manor house, Pendley Manor. This house was variously inhabited by the Verney, Anderson and Harcourt families until the mid-19th century.

Tring Park Mansion was designed by Sir Christopher Wren and was built in 1682 for the owner Henry Guy, Gentleman of the Privy Chamber to Charles II. John Washington, the son of the Reverend Lawrence Washington and Amphyllis Twigden, was born and brought up in Tring. In 1656 he left Tring to go on a trading voyage to Virginia, but after a shipwreck on the Potomac River he remained in Virginia, married and started a family which eventually included his great-grandson, George Washington, the first President of the United States.
The town's prosperity was greatly improved at the start of the 19th century by the construction nearby of the Grand Junction Canal, and soon afterwards in 1835 the London and Birmingham Railway. Industries which benefited included flour milling, brewing, silk weaving, lace-making and straw plaiting.

In 1835, the medieval Pendley Manor was destroyed by fire. A local landowner, Joseph Grout Williams, commissioned a new manor house to be built in Jacobean Revival style, and this building still stands today on Station Road.

In 1836 Thomas Butcher, a wholesale seed and corn merchant, and his son also called Thomas, established a private bank, Thomas Butcher & Son in Tring High Street. The business was subsequently run by the next generation of the family, Frederick and George, and was also known locally as Tring Old Bank. By 1900 it had branches in Aylesbury, Chesham and Berkhamsted. From this time it became the subject of successive bank consolidations, eventually becoming a branch of the National Westminster Bank, the last to be represented in the town.

In the late 19th century the estate became the home of the Rothschild family, whose influence on the town was considerable. The site for Tring Market House was presented by to the town by Nathan Rothschild, 1st Baron Rothschild. His son, Walter Rothschild, 2nd Baron Rothschild, built a private zoological museum in Tring. This housed perhaps the largest collection of stuffed animals worldwide. It has been part of the Natural History Museum, London since 1937, and in April 2007 the museum changed its name to the Natural History Museum at Tring in order to make people more aware of the museum's link to London's Natural History Museum. In 1902 the 2nd Lord Rothschild also released the edible dormouse (Glis glis) into Tring Park. He used to ride around the town in a carriage drawn by zebras. In the town centre of Tring there is a pavement maze in the shape of a Zebra's head in order to remember the link that Tring has to the Rothschild family.

The former livestock market place is now the home of a weekly Friday market and a fortnightly Saturday farmers' market. Some of the former livestock pens have been retained. The old livestock market office is now the home of the Tring Local History Museum, which opened in September 2010.

Governance
Tring is a part of the UK Parliament constituency of South West Hertfordshire. Gagan Mohindra has been the Member of Parliament (MP) since the December 2019 United Kingdom general election.

Tring has three tiers of local government at parish (town), district, and county level: Tring Town Council, Dacorum Borough Council, and Hertfordshire County Council. Since the local elections on 2 May 2019, Tring Town Council comprises 11 Liberal Democrats and 1 Conservative.

Administrative history

The parish of Tring formerly included a large rural area as well as the town itself, including Long Marston and Wilstone. The parish was administered by its vestry, in the same way as most small towns and rural areas. It was included in the Berkhamsted Poor Law Union from 1835.

The "Upper Hamlet" of the parish of Tring, covering the town, was made a local government district with effect from 2 February 1859, governed by a local board. Following the Public Health Act 1872, such local government districts were also called urban sanitary districts. Under the Local Government Act 1894, urban sanitary districts became urban districts on 31 December 1894. The 1894 Act also stipulated that a parish could not be partly in an urban district and partly outside it. The old parish of Tring was therefore split, with the part outside the urban district becoming a separate parish called Tring Rural with effect from its first parish meeting on 4 December 1894. The Tring Rural Parish, covering Long Marston, Wilstone and the surrounding areas, was included in the Berkhamsted Rural District.

Tring Urban District Council held its first meeting on 3 January 1895 at the Vestry Hall in Church Yard. The first chairman was Frederick Butcher, who had been the last chairman of the old local board. Tring Urban District Council continued to meet at the Vestry Hall until 1910, and had an office on Western Road. It then moved its meeting place to the Market House at 61 High Street, which had been built between 1898 and 1900. The council remained at Market House until 1952, when it moved to the former Tring Park estate office at 9 High Street, remaining there until the council's abolition.

Tring Urban District was abolished under the Local Government Act 1972, becoming part of the district of Dacorum on 1 April 1974. A successor parish was created for the former urban district, with its parish council taking the name Tring Town Council. The former urban district council's offices at 9 High Street became private offices, with the building being renamed the Counting House. Tring Town Council is based at the Market House at 61 High Street.

Geography

Tring is in west Hertfordshire, adjacent to the Buckinghamshire border, at a low point in the Chiltern Hills known as the 'Tring Gap'. This has been used as a crossing point since ancient times, being at the junction of the Icknield Way and under the Romans Akeman Street, the major Roman road linking London to Cirencester. It is transected east and west by the ancient earthwork called Grim's Dyke. It is located at the summit level of the Grand Union Canal and both the canal and railway pass through in deep cuttings.

The four Tring Reservoirs – Wilstone, Tringford, Startops End and Marsworth – were built to supply water for the canal. These have been a national nature reserve since 1955, and identified as a Site of Special Scientific Interest since 1987. Nearby, within the Chilterns Area of Outstanding Natural Beauty that almost surrounds the town, is the Ashridge Estate, part of the National Trust and home to Ashridge Business School.

The civil parish includes the hamlets of Little Tring, New Mill and Bulbourne to the north of Tring and Hastoe to the south.

Climate

Flour mill

Heygates Mill is a flour mill. Originally it was a windmill, and the company was run by William Mead. The windmill was demolished in 1910 to make way for a wheat storage silo. In those days, Mead lived on-site, in a house next to the yard, and owned half the area taken by the mill of today. The remaining space was occupied by boat-builders, Bushell Brothers, who built narrowboats for the canal. The Heygate family took over Mead's business in 1945, and today mills 100,000 tons of wheat a year, resulting in 76,000 tons of flour. This is mainly bakers' flour, but there is also a commitment to wholemeal digestive for biscuits, bulk outlets and a large output of 1.5 kg bags from the pre-packed flour plant.

In the days of the Tring windmill, only two men operated the system, milling ten stone per hour. Now, computerised, more than twelve tons per hour are produced. Heygate's Tring mill has 80 employees and sixteen trucks delivering throughout the south of England.

Economy

Tring Brewery has been operating in Tring since 1992.

The UK headquarters of Huel Ltd. is in Tring.

Tring is home to the Tring Book Festival; a ten-day festival held in November. Tring is part of the Dacorum Local Food Initiative.

Transport

Railway

The station is served by slow and semi-fast trains.

History

The station was originally opened in 1837 by the London & Birmingham Railway, under the direction of the railway engineer Robert Stephenson.

The remote location of Tring railway station was due to changes to the route of the railway imposed on Stephenson by local landowners such as Lord Brownlow, who wished to protect his Ashridge Estate. The location is sometimes wrongly attributed to objections, which were said to have been made by Lord Rothschild to protect his land in Tring; in fact, Lord Rothschild was not born until 1840, three years after the railway had opened, and the Tring lands were only acquired by his father Lionel in 1872.

Buses
Bus services in Tring are operated by Arriva, Red Rose Travel and Red Eagle. Key direct destinations include Aylesbury, Dunstable, Hemel Hempstead, Luton and Watford.

Roads
In 1973, the A41 Tring bypass was opened. The bypass runs through Tring Park and was originally conceived as the first stretch of a new motorway, the A41(M), which was planned to run from the M25 at Hunton Bridge to Aylesbury; the project was not realised and the bypass was downgraded to trunk road status.

Education

Tring School is a state secondary school and sixth form with approximately 1,500 pupils (ages 11–18). It is located on Mortimer Hill on the east side of the town. It is now designated a Specialist Humanities College with History, Geography and English as its lead subjects. It has had Academy status since September 2012.

Tring Park School for the Performing Arts (formerly known as the Arts Educational School, Tring Park) is an independent specialist performing arts and academic school. It is located in Tring Mansion, and has 300 pupils.

Tring has four state junior schools: Bishop Wood CE Junior School, Dundale Primary and Nursery School, Goldfield Infants and Nursery School and Grove Road Primary School.

Tring has a youth club – The Tring Youth Project – for those between 11 and 18 at the Temperance Hall in Christchurch Road.

Tring also has a theatre youth group, Court Youth Theatre, which is connected to the Court Theatre, Pendley Manor. This has three sections to it: juniors, intermediates and seniors.

There is also an air cadet squadron in Tring (2457 Squadron) on New Road.

Literature 
Edward Lear makes reference to Tring in A Book of Nonsense:

Sport
Tring Sports Centre is in the grounds of Tring School.

Tring is home to three football clubs: Tring Athletic, Tring Town and Tring Corinthians; all of which play in the Spartan South Midlands Football League. Tring Tornadoes is a youth football club, which field sides for boys and girls up to 16. The town is also home to a rugby club, Tring R.U.F.C., which won promotion to London Division One in 2008; Tring Hockey Club, with three men's and two ladies' sides; Tring Park Cricket Club, in the Home Counties Premier Cricket League; and a squash club

Notable people
Sir Francis Verney (1584–1615), English adventurer and pirate.
John Washington (1631–1677) great-grandfather of George Washington, the first President of the United States.
Sir William Gore (1643–1707), merchant and Lord Mayor of London. Subject of an impressive monument in the parish church.
John Brown (1795–1890), brewer in Tring; he built and owned several public houses in the area.
Gerald Massey (1828–1907) – poet, literary critic, Egyptologist and Spiritualist – was born nearby at Gamnel Wharf, New Mill, on the Wendover branch of the Grand Union Canal.
Lord Rothschild (1868–1937), banker, politician and zoologist.
Edward Barber (VC) (10 June 1893 – 12 March 1915) born and lived in Tring, was posthumously awarded the Victoria Cross for bravery during the Battle of Neuve Chapelle in the First World War.
Roger Moorhouse, a British historian and author
Lawrence Ward, former Serjeant at Arms of the British House of Commons lived at Kingsley Walk, Tring between 1977 and 1999, attending Dundale Junior and Tring Secondary Schools.
Julian James, a former professional footballer.
Graham Poll, an English former football referee for the Premier League and World Cup
Gilbert Lacy (1834–1878), cricketer
Arthur Butcher (1863–1955), cricketer
Robert Holmes (scriptwriter) (1926–1986), television writer, notable for writing several episodes of Doctor Who, was born in Tring.
Graham Barber, former Premiership referee and 2003 FA Cup Final referee, used to live in Tring.

Gallery

References

External links

Tring Town Council

 
Market towns in Hertfordshire
Civil parishes in Hertfordshire
Towns in Hertfordshire
Dacorum